Jonesboro is an unincorporated community in Clinton County, in the U.S. state of Ohio.

History
Located just south of Martinsville in Clark Township, Jonesboro was not officially platted.

References

Unincorporated communities in Clinton County, Ohio
Unincorporated communities in Ohio